Magda Kröner (1854–1935) was a German painter known for her still-lifes.

Biography 
Kröner née Helmcke was born on 24 January 1854 in Rendsburg, Germany. In 1883 she married the painter  (1838-1911) with whom she had two children. In 1895 she exhibited her art at the Crystal Palace in London where she received a bronze medal. In 1901 Kaiser Wilhelm II purchased two of her paintings.

The Kröners settled in Düsseldorf and one of their sons,  (1889-1963), had a career in painting.  

Kröner died on 31 October 1935 in Düsseldorf.

Gallery

References

External links

images of Kröner's work on MutualArt
images of Kröner's work on ArtNet

1854 births
1935 deaths
People from Rendsburg
19th-century German women artists
20th-century German women artists